Giba (born 1976) is the nickname of volleyball player Gilberto Amaury de Godoy Filho.

Giba may also refer to:

Places
Italy
 Giba, Sardinia, a comune in the Province of South Sardinia
Ethiopia
 Giba River, a river in the Tigray Region
South Africa
 Giba Gorge Nature Reserve,  a environmental precinct in Outer West Durban, South Africa

People
 Giba (footballer) (1962–2014), nickname of football player and manager Antônio Gilberto Maniaes
 Márta Giba (born 1943), Hungarian handball player

Other uses
 Giba, a letter in the Gothic alphabet